(former name; Tomoe Sakai, 酒井 與惠) is a former Japanese football player. She played for Japan national team.

Club career
Kato was born in Tokyo on May 27, 1978. She played for Nippon TV Beleza from 1993 to 2008. The club won L.League championship 8 times. She played 246 matches in L.League. She was selected MVP awards 2 times in 2001 and 2002. She was also selected Best Eleven for 12 years in a row (1996-2007).

National team career
On June 8, 1997, when Kato was 19 years old, she debuted for Japan national team against China. She was a member of Japan for 1999, 2003, 2007 World Cup, 2004 and 2008 Summer Olympics. She played 114 games and scored 8 goals for Japan until 2008.

Personal life
Kato got married and changed her name to Tomoe Kato (加藤 與惠) from Tomoe Sakai (酒井 與惠) in November 2007.

National team statistics

International goals

References

External links
Tomoe Sakai – FIFA competition record
 

 

1978 births
Living people
Tokyo Women's College of Physical Education alumni
Association football people from Tokyo
Japanese women's footballers
Japan women's international footballers
Nadeshiko League players
Nippon TV Tokyo Verdy Beleza players
1999 FIFA Women's World Cup players
2003 FIFA Women's World Cup players
2007 FIFA Women's World Cup players
Olympic footballers of Japan
Footballers at the 2004 Summer Olympics
Footballers at the 2008 Summer Olympics
Asian Games medalists in football
Footballers at the 1998 Asian Games
Footballers at the 2002 Asian Games
Footballers at the 2006 Asian Games
Women's association football midfielders
Asian Games silver medalists for Japan
Asian Games bronze medalists for Japan
FIFA Century Club
Medalists at the 1998 Asian Games
Medalists at the 2002 Asian Games
Medalists at the 2006 Asian Games
Nadeshiko League MVPs